No One Cares is a 1959 studio album by Frank Sinatra. It is generally considered a sequel to Sinatra's 1957 album Where Are You? (also arranged by Gordon Jenkins), and shares a similar sad and lonesome, gloomy theme and concept as In the Wee Small Hours and Only the Lonely (both arranged by Nelson Riddle).

No One Cares was described by critics as the singer's saddest and darkest album – Sinatra himself purportedly referred to it as a collection of "suicide songs".

Background
At a press interview given around the time of the album's release, Sinatra summed up the mood of the album as:“We left out 'Gloomy Sunday’ [a song that reportedly has supplied the impetus for a dozen or so suicides] because it was too swingin'. Seriously though, it was a tough album to make and a tough mood to sustain. But Gordon Jenkins and I were thinking alike and everything came out perfectly. I liked doing this album because I think it will mean something to a lot of people - people who know how it is when no one cares."

Versions 
No One Cares was originally released on July 20, 1959, in both stereo and monaural Hi-Fi versions, each containing eleven songs. 

A twelfth song, "The One I Love (Belongs to Somebody Else)", was recorded at the sessions, but left unreleased until 1973. In 1990, that song was released in the 3-disc set "The Capitol Years", but whereas the 1973 release included two carefully placed edits to correct a gaffe in the lyrics and a poorly played string passage, the 1990 track was presented raw, without these corrections.

The 1991 CD reissue of the album contains a new mix from the 3-track tapes. All other issues, including the release in the 1998 UK boxed set, use the original 1959 stereo mix.

Tracks 1 and 10, though arranged by Gordon Jenkins as part of the original concept, were conducted by Nelson Riddle (uncredited) in Jenkins' absence. On CD, the final three bonus tracks were not part of the original album, and are arranged and conducted by Nelson Riddle. One of these, "This Was My Love", was recorded at the same session as "When No One Cares" and "I'll Never Smile Again".

Artwork 
The photograph used for the cover artwork was taken at Sinatra's Puccini restaurant in Beverly Hills, California (which he co-owned with Peter Lawford). The liner notes were written by Jazz magazine critic Ralph Gleason. In promotion of the album, Capitol Records had 2,000 giant blowups of the cover printed for display at point-of-purchase locations.

Track listing 
Credits are adapted from the album's liner notes.

Personnel
 Frank Sinatra - vocals
 Gordon Jenkins - arranger, conductor

Tracks 1, 10, 13:

James Decker, James McGee, Sinclair Lott (french horns); Ronny Lang, Willie Schwartz, Ted Nash, Sal Franzella, Buddy Collette, Harry Schuchman (woodwinds); Felix Slatkin, Paul Shure, Alex Beller, Dan Lube, Mischa Russell, Marshall Sosson, Nicholas Pisani, Nathan Ross, Emo Neufeld, Joe Stepansky, Murray Kellner, Carl LaMagna, Jacques Gasselin, Henry Hill, Harry Bluestone, Arnold Belnick (violins); Alvin Dinkin, Alex Neiman, Paul Robyn, David Sterkin (violas); James Arkatov, Victor Gottlieb (cello); Kathryn Julye (harp); Bill Miller (piano); Al Viola (guitar); Mike Rubin (double bass); Bill Richmond (drums). Nelson Riddle, Gordon Jenkins (arr).

Tracks 2, 4, 7, 9:

Vincent DeRosa, Richard Perissi, John Cave (fr-h); Willie Schwartz, Wayne Songer, Clyde Hylton, Dent Eckels, Matty Matlock (wwd); Bert Gassman (oboe); Mischa Russell, David Frisina, Walter Edelstein, Joseph Livoti, Jacques Gasselin, Emo Neufeld, Paul Shure, Felix Slatkin, Marshall Sosson, Harry Bluestone, Joseph Quadri, Victor Amo, Murray Kellner, Dan Lube, Lou Raderman, Ben Gill (vln); William Baffa, Louis Kievman, David Sterkin, Paul
Robyn (vla); Armand Kaproff, Ray Kramer (vlc); Kathryn Thompson Vail (harp); Bill Miller (p); Allan Reuss (g); Jack Ryan (b); Nick Fatool (d); Gordon Jenkins (cond).

Tracks 3, 5, 8, 11:

Vincent DeRosa, John Cave, Richard Perissi (fr-h); Willie Schwartz, Clyde Hylton, Matty Matlock, Dent Eckels, Wayne Songer (wwd); Norman Beno (oboe); Dan Lube, Joseph Quadri, Lou Raderman, Joseph Livoti, Murray Kellner, Jacques Gasselin, Ben Gill, Walter Edelstein, Harry Bluestone, Paul Shure, Victor Amo, Emo Neufeld, Mischa Russell, Nathan Ross, Felix Slatkin, Marshall Sosson (vln); David Sterkin, William Baffa, Paul Robyn, Louis Kievman (via); Armand Kaproff, Ray Kramer (vie); Kathryn Thompson Vail (harp); Bill Miller (p); Allan Reuss (g); Jack Ryan (b); Nick Fatool (d); Gordon Jenkins (Cond).

Track 6, 12:

Arthur Frantz, Richard Perissi, John Cave (fr-h); Matty Matlock, Dent Eckels, Wayne Songer, Clyde Hylton, Paul McLarand (wwd); Norman Benno (oboe); Mischa Russell, Walter Edelstein, Joseph Livoti, Joseph Quadri, Jacques Gasselin, Dan Lube, Lou Raderman, Emo Neufeld, Murray Kellner, Victor Amo, Harry Bluestone, Felix Slatkin, Ben Gill, Marshall Sosson, Paul Shure, Gerald Vinci (vln); Louis Kievman, Paul Robyn, William Baffa, Allan Harshman (via); Armand Kaproff, Ray Kramer (vie); Kathryn Thompson Vail (harp); Bill Miller (p); Allan Reuss (g); Jack Ryan (b); Nick Fatool (d); Gordon Jenkins (Cond).

Track 14:

Tommy Pederson (tbn); George Roberts (b-tbn); John Cave, John Graas (fr-h); Harry Klee, Champ Webb, Skeets Herfurt (sax/wwd); Mischa Russell, Gerald Vinci, Harry Bluestone, Felix Slatkin, Paul Shure, Victor Bay, Henry Hill, Alex Beller, Anatol Kaminsky (vln); David Sterkin, Paul Robyn (via); Cy Bernard, Eleanor Slatkin (vlc); Kathryn Julye (harp); Bill Miller (p); Bob Bain (g); Joe Comfort (b); Alvin Stoller (d); Nelson Riddle (arr).

Track 15:

Shorty Sherock, Harry Edison, Johnny Best, Zeke Zarchy (tpt); Dick Noel, Paul Tanner, Jimmy Priddy (tbn); George Roberts (b-tbn); Willie Schwartz, Mahlon Clark, Justin Gordon, Champ Webb, Robert Lawson (sax/wwd); Emo Neufeld, Samuel Cytron, Robert Gross, Alex Murray, Paul Nero, Henry Hill, Mischa Russell, Dan Lube, Victor Bay, Alex Beller (vln); Maxine Johnson, Paul Robyn, David Sterkin (via); Ennio Bolognini, Ray Kramer, Eleanor Slatkin (vlc); Kathryn Julye (harp); Bill Miller (p); George Van Eps (g); Joe Comfort (b); Irving Cottier (d); Frank Flynn (perc); Nelson Riddle (arr).

References

External links 
 No One Cares at Spotify (streamed copy where licensed) 
 
 
 
 Ralph J. Gleason liner notes

1959 albums
Albums arranged by Gordon Jenkins
Albums arranged by Nelson Riddle
Albums conducted by Gordon Jenkins
Albums conducted by Nelson Riddle
Albums produced by Dave Cavanaugh
Albums recorded at Capitol Studios
Capitol Records albums
Concept albums
Frank Sinatra albums